This is the complete list of Asian Winter Games medalists in alpine skiing from 1986 to 2017.

Men

Slalom

Giant slalom

Super-G

Downhill

Super combined

Women

Slalom

Giant slalom

Super-G

Downhill

Super combined

References

External links
 FIS Database
 1990 Results
 1996 Results

Alpine skiing
medalists